William, Billy or Bill Lindsay may refer to:

Politics
William Lindsay (diplomat) (fl. 1790s), Scottish diplomat and colonial governor
William Lindsay (Canadian politician) (1813–1895), Irish-born merchant and political figure in New Brunswick, Canada
William Schaw Lindsay (1815–1877), British merchant and  member of parliament for Tynemouth and North Shields, and Sunderland
William Burns Lindsay Jr. (1824–1872), Clerk of the House of Commons of Canada
William Lindsay (Kentucky politician) (1835–1909), U.S. Senator from Kentucky 
William Lindsay (Wisconsin politician) (1840–1927), Republican member of the Wisconsin State Assembly
William Arthur Lindsay (1866–1936), member of parliament for Belfast South, 1917–1918, and Belfast Cromac, 1918–1922
William M. Lindsay (1880–1957), American politician, Lieutenant Governor of Kansas
William J. Lindsay (1945–2013), American politician in Suffolk County, New York

Sports
Bill Lindsay (born 1971), American ice hockey player
Bill Lindsay (third baseman) (1881–1963), American baseball player
Bill Lindsay (Negro leagues) (1891–1914), American Negro leagues pitcher
Billy Lindsay (1872–1933), English footballer for Everton, Grimsby Town, Newcastle United, Luton Town and Watford 
William Lindsay (baseball) (1905–2006), American Negro league shortstop
William Lindsay (field hockey) (1916–1971), British field hockey player
William Lindsay (footballer) (1847–1923), England international footballer, three times FA Cup winner
William Lindsay (Scottish footballer) (1886–1976), Scottish footballer for Morton and Glentoran

Other
William Lindsay of Dovehill (died 1679), Scottish Presbyterian minister
William Lindsay, 18th Earl of Crawford (died 1698), Scottish noble and Presbyterian
William Lindsay (minister) (1802–1866),  Scottish United Presbyterian minister
William Lindsay (officer of arms) (1846–1926), officer of arms at the College of Arms in London
William Bethune Lindsay (1880–1933), Canadian military officer during World War I
William O'Brien Lindsay (1909–1975), Chief Justice of the Sudan, first-class cricketer
William Lindsay (actor) (1945–1986), British television actor
William Lindsay (shipowner) (1819–1884), Scottish lawyer and shipowner, Lord Provost of Leith
William Lauder Lindsay (1829–1880), Scottish botanist

See also
Bill Lindsey (born 1960), baseball catcher
William Lindsey (fl. 1920s), Negro league baseball player
William B. Lindsey, member of the Virginia House of Delegates